Voices of Theory is an American contemporary R&B group that was active in the early 1990s. The group released their eponymous debut album in 1997, which produced the hit singles "Say It" and "Wherever You Go"; which peaked at #10 and #36, respectively, on the Billboard Hot 100.

Discography
Voices of Theory (H.O.L.A. Recordings, 1997) #32 Billboard Heatseekers Albums, #56 R&B Albums

Singles

References

American contemporary R&B musical groups
American boy bands
PolyGram artists